Patriarch Nephon of Constantinople may refer to: 

 Nephon I of Constantinople, Ecumenical Patriarch in 1310–1314
 Nephon II of Constantinople, Ecumenical Patriarch in 1486–1488, 1497–1498 and 1502